Guitar Moods is an album by American jazz guitarist Mundell Lowe featuring tracks recorded in 1956 for the Riverside label.

Reception

Allmusic awarded the album 4 stars with Scott Yanow calling it "quite memorable. Guitar Moods, which lives up to its name, is recommended".

Track listing
 "Speak Low" (Ogden Nash, Kurt Weill) - 2:38
 "We'll Be Together Again" (Carl Fischer, Frankie Laine) - 2:07
 "Memories of You" (Eubie Blake, Andy Razaf) - 3:48
 "Ill Wind" (Harold Arlen, Ted Koehler) - 3:02
 "You Don't Know What Love Is" (Gene de Paul, Don Raye) - 3:08
 "I Dream Too Much" (Dorothy Fields, Jerome Kern) - 2:18
 "June in January" (Ralph Rainger, Leo Robin) - 2:54
 "I'll Take Romance" (Oscar Hammerstein II, Ben Oakland) - 1:53
 "It's So Peaceful in the Country" (Alec Wilder) - 4:11
 "Our Waltz" (David Rose) - 1:54
 "I'm Old Fashioned" (Jerome Kern, Johnny Mercer) - 2:09
 "Goodbye" (Gordon Jenkins) - 3:06
Recorded at Van Gelder Studio in Hackensack, New Jersey on February 20 (tracks 1, 2, 5, 8, 9 & 11) and March 2 (tracks 3, 4, 6, 7, 10 & 12), 1956

Personnel 
Mundell Lowe - guitar
Al Klink - bass clarinet, flute (tracks 1, 2, 5, 8, 9 & 11)
Phil Bodner - oboe, English horn (tracks 3, 4, 6, 7, 10 & 12)
Trigger Alpert - bass
Ed Shaughnessy - drums

References 

 

1956 albums
Mundell Lowe albums
Albums produced by Orrin Keepnews
Riverside Records albums